Marcella Jeandeau (26 June 1928 – 13 November 2018) was an Italian sprinter. She competed in the women's 4 × 100 metres relay at the 1948 Summer Olympics.

References

External links
 

1928 births
2018 deaths
Athletes (track and field) at the 1948 Summer Olympics
Italian female sprinters
Olympic athletes of Italy
Athletes from Naples
Olympic female sprinters
20th-century Italian women
21st-century Italian women